Brownea macrophylla is a tree in the legume family Fabaceae. The specific epithet  is from the Latin meaning "large leaved".

Description
Inflorescences are densely flowered with flowers featuring orange petals.

Distribution and habitat
Brownea macrophylla is native to Panama, Colombia, Ecuador, Peru and Venezuela. In Panama, its habitat is in tropical forest.

References

External links
 Discovering Colombia's rare flora and fauna at BBC News

macrophylla
Flora of Panama
Flora of western South America
Flora of Venezuela
Plants described in 1873